Jaanisaar is a 2015 Indian Hindi-language film, directed by Muzaffar Ali, and written by Javed Siddiqui, Shama Zaidi and Muzaffar Ali. Jaanisaar is a love saga of a revolutionary courtesan of Avadh, India, and a prince brought up in England, set 20 years after the first war of Indian Rebellion of 1857. The film stars Pakistani actor Imran Abbas and fashion entrepreneur Pernia Qureshi, who made her debut with the film. The film was released on 7 August 2015.

Plot 
A period drama set in 1877, the film depicts the story of a revolutionary killer, Prince Amir Haydar, Noor and Mir Mohsin Sahab. Raja Amir Haydar, A Prince from a Princely State of India son of Nawab Raja Abbas Haydar. After the death of his Father he is sent to London by the British and comes  back to India after completion of his studies. Noor, a dancer who fights against the British secretly in the organization made by Mir Mohsin. Raja Amir Haydar and Noor both fall in love and Raja Amir Haydar also participates in the freedom fight against the British alongside Noor and Mir Mohsin Sahab.

Cast

Production

Development 
Jaanisaar marks the comeback of director Muzaffar Ali, who is known for his cult film Umrao Jaan (1981). The film was initially titled Raqs: The Dance Within, but was later changed to Jaanisaar. Muzaffar Ali said in an interview− "People would often ask me what 'Raqs' means, so I thought of calling the film something that was more familiar, like 'Jaanisaar'. There were also some problems with registering the name. 'Raqs' is already registered with a body, I wasn't aware of. So, we had to rename the film." The film is produced by Ali's wife, Meera, and Arno Krimmer is the executive producer. Regarding the story-line, Ali commented− "I feel our own people need to learn certain parts of our history to become more responsible citizen. History is written into two ways -- written by conqueror and the other one is the human history. I felt this story has to be told. The country needs to know this story."

Filming 
The film has been entirely shot in Uttar Pradesh, mostly in Lucknow Quaiserbagh Baradari. Some scenes were filmed at the director's hometown, Kotwara (Lakhimpur-Kheri, U.P.) Ali remarked− "Jaanisaar is set in 20 years after Umrao Jaan, that is 1877. I always like to delve into the past to look at the future. I shot the film in our house." Birju Maharaj and Kumudini Lakhia have choreographed the dance sequences.

Casting 
The film has Pakistani actor Imran Abbas Naqvi, his second film in Bollywood, preceded by Creature 3D. It also marks the debut of Pernia Qureshi, who is a notable fashion stylist and costume designer by profession. Regarding her appearance in the film, director Muzaffar Ali remarked, "Pernia is different. I needed a strong dancer and at the same time a fresh face. She really danced her life out into the film. She did a very good job of a revolutionary dancer."

Soundtrack
Playback singers for Jaanisaar include notable Indian and Pakistani artists such as Shreya Ghoshal, Abida Parveen and Sukhwinder Singh and famous folk singer Malini Awasthi. The music has been composed by Muzaffar Ali & Ustad Shafqat Ali Khan. Shreya Ghoshal has given her voice to 5 tracks from the album. The full album was released on 24 July 2015.

References

External links 
 

2015 films
2010s Hindi-language films
Films about courtesans in India
Films set in the British Raj
Films directed by Muzaffar Ali